James Tolmie (born 21 November 1960) is a Scottish retired footballer who played for clubs including Morton, Lokeren and Manchester City.

He started his career at Morton and made his senior debut on 28 October 1978. Then he was sold to Belgian side Lokeren in 1981, playing 18 games without scoring before returning to Britain in 1983.

Tolmie was signed by Billy McNeill for City from Lokeren for £30,000. Jim was the third signing in nine days made by McNeill, who had himself just joined City from Celtic. He left Manchester City and spent many years playing in Sweden with Markaryd IF, before returning to Morton in 1991. He retired in 1994.

References

External links
Scotland U21 stats at Fitbastats

1960 births
Living people
Footballers from Glasgow
Scottish footballers
Scottish expatriate footballers
Greenock Morton F.C. players
K.S.C. Lokeren Oost-Vlaanderen players
Manchester City F.C. players
Carlisle United F.C. players
Expatriate footballers in Belgium
Expatriate footballers in Sweden
Scottish Football League players
English Football League players
Association football wingers
Scottish Football League representative players
Scotland under-21 international footballers
Scottish expatriate sportspeople in Belgium
Scottish expatriate sportspeople in Sweden